Gurab Dagchi (also Romanized as Gūrāb Dagchī; also known as Dagchī) is a village in Chelo Rural District, Chelo District, Andika County, Khuzestan Province, Iran. At the 2006 census, its population was 89, in 18 families.

References 

Populated places in Andika County